John Rollinson may refer to:
 John K. Rollinson (1884–1948), American writer of western non-fiction
 John A. Rollinson III (born 1950), American businessman and politician in the Virginia General Assembly